Liberation Day, also known as the Anniversary of Italy's Liberation, Anniversary of the Resistance, or simply 25 April is a national holiday in Italy that commemorates the victory of the Italian resistance movement against Nazi Germany and the Italian Social Republic, puppet state of the Nazis and rump state of the fascists, in the Italian Civil War, a civil war fought in Italy during World War II. That is distinct from Republic Day, which takes place on 2 June.

History 

Although other European countries such as Norway, the Netherlands, and France also had partisan movements and collaborationist governments with Nazi Germany during World War II, armed confrontation between compatriots was most intense in Italy, making the Italian case unique. In 1965, the definition of "civil war" was used for the first time by fascist politician and historian Giorgio Pisanò in his books, while Claudio Pavone's book Una guerra civile. Saggio storico sulla moralità della Resistenza (A Civil War. Historical Essay On the Morality Of the Resistance), published in 1991, led the term "Italian Civil War" to become a widespread term used in Italian and international historiography.

The date was chosen by convention, as it was the day of the year 1945 when the National Liberation Committee of Upper Italy (CLNAI) - whose command was based in Milan and was chaired by Alfredo Pizzoni, Luigi Longo, Emilio Sereni, Sandro Pertini, and Leo Valiani (present among others the designated president Rodolfo Morandi, Giustino Arpesani, and Achille Marazza) - proclaimed a general insurrection in all the territories still occupied by the Nazi-fascists, indicating to all the partisan forces active in Northern Italy that were part of the Volunteer Corps of Freedom to attack the fascist and German garrisons by imposing the surrender, days before the arrival of the Allied troops; at the same time, the National Liberation Committee for Northern Italy personally issued legislative decrees, assuming power "in the name of the Italian people and as a delegate of the Italian Government", establishing among other things the death sentence for all fascist hierarchs, including Benito Mussolini, who would be shot and killed three days later. "Surrender or die!" was the rallying call of the partisans that day and those immediately following.

The end of the war on Italian territory, with the definitive surrender of the Nazi-Fascist forces to the Allied Army, took place on 2 May, as formally established by the representatives of the forces in the field during the so-called surrender of Caserta, signed on 29 April 1945: these dates also mark the definitive defeat of fascism. By 1 May, all of northern Italy was liberated, including Bologna (21 April), Genoa (23 April), Milan (25 April), Turin and Venice (28 April). The liberation put an end to 23 years of fascist dictatorship and five years of war.  The aftermath of World War II left Italy with an anger against the monarchy for its endorsement of the Fascist regime for those 23 years. These frustrations contributed to a revival of the Italian republican movement. The liberation symbolically represents the beginning of the historical journey which led to the referendum of 2 June 1946, when Italians opted for the end of the monarchy and the creation of the Italian Republic, which was followed by the adoption of the Constitution of the Republic in 1948, resulting from the work of a Constituent Assembly formed by the representatives of all the anti-fascist forces that contributed to the defeat of Nazi and Fascist forces during the Italian Civil War.

Institution and celebrations 

The current date was chosen in 1946. On the proposal of the Prime Minister Alcide De Gasperi, King Umberto II, then prince and lieutenant of the Kingdom of Italy, on 22 April 1946 issued the lieutenant legislative decree n. 185 "Disposizioni in materia di ricorrenze festive" ("Provisions on festive occasions"). The bill states that:

 

The anniversary was also celebrated in subsequent years, but only on 27 May 1949, article 2 of law n. 260 "Disposizioni in materia di ricorrenze festive" ("Provisions on festive occasions") made the anniversary a permanent, annual national holiday, together with the Italian national holiday of 2 June:

Since then, public events in memory of the event, like marches and parades, have been organized annually in all Italian cities - especially in those decorated with military valor for the war of liberation. Among the events of the festival program there is the solemn homage, by the President of Italy and other important officers of the State, to the chapel of the Italian Unknown Soldier (Milite Ignoto), buried in the Altare della Patria in Rome, with the deposition of a laurel wreath in memory of the fallen and missing Italians in wars.

See also

 Italian Civil War
 Italian resistance movement
 National Liberation Committee
 Liberation Day
 Public holidays in Italy
 Anniversary of the Unification of Italy
 Festa della Repubblica
 National Memorial Day of the Exiles and Foibe
 National Unity and Armed Forces Day
 Tricolour Day

References

External links 

Public holidays in Italy
1946 establishments in Italy
Recurring events established in 1946
April observances